Saula Waqa (born 12 October 1995) is a Fijian footballer who plays for Ba FC in the Fiji National Football League. He represented Fiji in the football competition at the 2016 Summer Olympics. Waqa has represented Nailaga Football Club and Flying Arrows Football Club in the local district club competitions. Being picked into the Ba squad at a very young age, Waqa has been instrumental in many big matches for the Fiji football giants scoring crucial goals. He was rewarded by Ba FC with the captain's arm bend at the age of 24 in 2020 after many senior players retired or left the club to join other teams.

Controversies 
IDC Suspension

Fiji FA disciplinary committee suspended Waqa from taking part in the 2017 Inter District Championship pool round after he had failed to show up for an earlier national team training camp. He was suspended along with Nadi's striker, Rusiate Matarerega.

Positive drug use

Saula Waqa was the captain of the Ba Football team for the 2020 Battle of the Giants Tournament where he tested positive for banned substance after the first round of matches. He was subsequently suspended from all levels of football for 3 years by the Fiji Football Association. Fiji Football Association's CEO, Mohammed Yusuf said Waqa was a repeat offender. Waqa and the Ba Football Association were also fined $500 each. Saula Waqa scored twice as Ba beat Nasinu 7–3 in their opening match of the tournament.

International career

International goals
Scores and results list Fiji's goal tally first.

Honours

Individual
 2014–15 OFC Champions League Golden Boot - 5 goals
 2017 Fiji National Football League Golden Boot - 10 goals
 2017 Pacific Mini Games Golden Boot - 7 goals

References

External links

Living people
1995 births
People from Ra Province
Fiji international footballers
Footballers at the 2016 Summer Olympics
Olympic footballers of Fiji
Fijian footballers
Association football forwards